Stefano Buono (born 1966) is an Italian physicist, Chief Executive Officer and member of the board of directors of Advanced Accelerator Applications, a company he founded in 2002 to develop a patent from the European Organization for Nuclear Research (CERN) in the radioisotope production field.

Biography
Stefano Buono was born in 1966 in Avellino, Italy. He attended high school in Turin, Italy and received his master's degree in physics from the University of Turin in 1991.

Career as physicist
Prior to founding Advanced Accelerator Applications in 2002, Stefano Buono worked as a physicist at the Centre for Advanced Studies, Research and Development or CRS4. During his six years within CRS4, he headed a team of engineers working on different international research projects in the field of energy production and nuclear waste transmutation (Accelerator-Driven Systems). 
Before joining CRS4 and in parallel to his appointment at CRS4,  Stefano Buono worked for approximately ten years with physics Nobel laureate Carlo Rubbia at CERN, one of the leading research laboratory for particle physics in the world. During that term, he also actively participated in the development of CERN's Adiabatic Resonance Crossing method.

Advanced Accelerator Applications
In 2002, Stefano Buono founded Advanced Accelerator Applications (NASDAQ: AAAP), a radiopharmaceutical company that develops, produces and commercializes molecular nuclear medicine, diagnostic and therapeutic products. Today AAA trades on the Nasdaq Global Select Market under the ticker “AAAP.” The first day of trading was 11 November 2015.

Besides being a key founder of Advanced Accelerator Applications, Stefano Buono is CEO of the company and member of its board of directors.

He is also the author of numerous scientific publications.

References

1966 births
Living people
21st-century Italian physicists
People associated with CERN
University of Turin alumni
People from Avellino
Italian chief executives